Red Knob may refer to:

 Red Knob (amplifier), a type of Fender amplifier
 Red Knob (Custer County, Montana), a mountain in Custer County
 Red Knob (Madison County, Montana), a mountain in Madison County
 Red Knob, West Virginia, unincorporated community in Roane County